The 1965 Commonwealth Prime Ministers' Conference was the 14th Meeting of the Heads of Government of the Commonwealth of Nations. It was held in the United Kingdom in June 1965, and was hosted by that country's Prime Minister, Harold Wilson.

The Conference approved Prime Minister Wilson's proposal for a Commonwealth peace mission to Vietnam; Wilson subsequently shelved the initiative. The body also approved the creation of the Commonwealth Secretariat proposed at the previous summit and appoints Canadian Arnold Smith as the first Commonwealth Secretary-General. The meeting also discussed the crisis in Rhodesia, relations with South Africa and Portuguese colonies in Africa, and opposition by Asian and African Commonwealth countries to British, Australian and New Zealand's support for American intervention in the Vietnam War. The Commonwealth reaffirmed its declaration that all Commonwealth states should work for societies based on racial equality.

Participants

References

External links
Newsreel

1965
Diplomatic conferences in the United Kingdom
20th-century diplomatic conferences
1965 in international relations
1965 in London
United Kingdom and the Commonwealth of Nations
1965 conferences
June 1965 events in the United Kingdom
Harold Wilson
Robert Menzies
Lester B. Pearson
Kwame Nkrumah
Julius Nyerere